Daybreak is a master-planned community over 4,000 acres (16 km²) in land area. Construction began in 2004 under the direction of land development company Kennecott Land (a subsidiary of Rio Tinto Group) in South Jordan, Utah. In 2016, the balance of the land holding was sold to Minneapolis-based investment firm Värde Partners, and a new development company called Daybreak Communities was formed to continue development of the project. On April 12, 2021, it was announced that the remaining 1,300 undeveloped acres were sold to Larry H. Miller Real Estate.  The community is expected to continue building for the next 18 to 20 years. When completed, it could contain more than 20,000 residential units and approximately 9.1 million square feet (850,000 m²) of commercial space.

Description

All homes in the community are Energy Star certified. Daybreak was the first community of its size in the region to adhere to Energy Star standards, and the entire community has been designed and built with sustainability in mind. Many of the home builders in the community offer options including solar and thermal panels, renewable building materials and high performance appliances. Many homes in Daybreak have fiber-optic internet connections.

In October of 2021, IHP Capital Partners and Fieldstone Homes announced a project to develop dozens of houses inside of Daybreak.

Daybreak master planners included  Calthorpe Associates of Berkeley, California; Ken Kay Associates of San Francisco, California; Loci of Salt Lake City, Utah; and Urban Design Associates of Pittsburgh, Pennsylvania.

Amenities
The Red Line of the Utah Transit Authority's (UTA) light rail system (via the Daybreak Parkway station and South Jordan Parkway station) gives the residents of Daybreak and the southwest Salt Lake Valley access to Downtown Salt Lake City and the University of Utah, as well as connections to the Salt Lake City International Airport. The Mountain View Corridor also provides access to Daybreak, and Bangerter Highway (SR 154) lies along the eastern edge. Daybreak is also located adjacent to a shopping center known as "The District", which contains  of retail space.

The development contains six schools:  Daybreak, Eastlake, and Golden Fields Elementary, two charter schools, Early Light Academy and American Academy of Innovation and one middle school, Mountain Creek. Currently high school students attend Herriman High School. Development is underway for a new elementary school in Highland Park Village, expected to open for the 2021 school year.

Daybreak has a community center, with a gym and exercise area, as well as two swimming pools and two splash pads/wading pools. There is also a fenced dog park and community garden. The lake began construction in 2005 and is now fully developed. The Watercourse, a new water feature, is scheduled to begin construction in 2019 and will be available 2022 at the earliest.

Harmons opened a grocery store in Daybreak on April 27, 2022.

In early 2023, the Larry H. Miller Company announced that it would build a stadium for the Salt Lake Bees, a AAA minor-league baseball team, in Daybreak. The stadium will be built entirely with private funding.

Governance
Daybreak is managed by the Daybreak Community Association.

References

External links
Daybreak Utah – Community Developer Official site
MyDaybreak –  The Daybreak Community Association and LiveDAYBREAK lifestyle website. This is a community information site.
Photo Gallery – Flickr photo gallery dedicated to the Daybreak Community
Daybreak Map – A map of Daybreak development on Google Maps

South Jordan, Utah
New Urbanism communities
Populated places established in 2004
2004 establishments in Utah